was Japanese Ambassador to the United States from 2008 to 2012.  He was previously the Japanese Ambassador to the United Nations and to the World Trade Organization.

Fujisaki attended junior high school in Seattle, Washington as an exchange student in the 1960s. Fujisaki entered the Japanese Ministry of Foreign Affairs in 1969. Over the course of his diplomatic career, Fujisaki served as Director-General of the North American Affairs Bureau in the Ministry of Foreign Affairs and as Deputy Minister for Foreign Affairs and overseas in Jakarta, London, and Paris. In his capacity as Deputy Foreign Minister, he served as personal representative of Japanese Prime Minister Junichiro Koizumi to the G8 summit from 2002 to 2005.

He is now a Guest Professor at Keio University.

He received his degree in economics from Keio University (Following Keio Jr. High and Keio High School). He then attended Stanford University Graduate School, Department of Political Science.

Ancestry

Notes

External links

 "New ambassadors named to U.S. and Britain" Japan Times, April 2, 2008

1947 births
Living people
Ambassadors of Japan to the United States
Keio University alumni
Academic staff of Keio University
People from Kagoshima Prefecture
Stanford University alumni
Itochu people